The Colorado Aviation Hall of Fame was established by the Colorado Aviation Historical Society (CAHS) in Denver, Colorado, USA, on November 11, 1969 for the State of Colorado.  The original and first ten Colorado aviation pioneers were inducted into the Hall on that date.  Guest speaker for the event was author Ernest K. Gann.  The Hall of Fame is part of the Society's Heritage Hall in the Wings Over the Rockies Air and Space Museum, Denver, Colorado.

Originally, to be considered for the Hall of Fame, ones' pioneering activities were to be completed before November 11, 1918.  Subsequently, the cut-off date was changed to 1935, then eliminated.  Aviation pioneering including development of airports, air mail routes, flying training facilities, flight management and mapping, aviation and aerospace manufacturing and maintenance, aviation weather tracking and forecasting, teaching and educating, advancements in aviation business, and military achievements. These are some of the activities that challenged Colorado aviators and aviation business persons.

In the first 25 years of the Hall of Fame, over 160 Coloradans and organizations have been inducted and so honored.

Pioneers of southern Colorado

CAHS has highlighted the history of its Hall Of Fame Laureates from Southern Colorado with an exhibit of photos and biographies.

Original ten inductees of 1969
1) Ivy BaldwinBio
2) Allan F. Bonnalie
3) Ira Boyd "Bumps" Humphreys - See Grant-Humphreys Mansion.
4) Albert E. Humphreys
5) Will D. "Billy" Parker
6) Chriss J. Peterson
7) Reginald Sinclaire
8) George W. Thompson
9) Frank A. Van Dersarl
10) Jerry Cox Vasconcells, World War I Ace
List of current inductees
 Complete list

See also

 North American aviation halls of fame
 National Aviation Hall of Fame

References

External links
 Wings Over the Rockies Air & Space Museum, Denver CO

Aviation halls of fame
Aerospace museums in Colorado
Halls of fame in Colorado
State halls of fame in the United States
Museums in Denver